Samuel Amofa (born 23 March 1999) is a Ghanaian professional footballer who plays as defender for Liberty Professionals.

Career 
Born in Berekum, Brong-Ahafo, Amofa started his career with Dansoman-based team Liberty Professionals in 2019 and immediately established himself as one of the two centre-back pair. He made his debut on 31 March 2019, playing the full 90 minutes of a 3–1 loss to West African Football Academy in the 2019 GFA Normalization Committee Special Competition. He played 12 out of 14 matches helping the club to a third-place finish in Group B. He continued to play more matches by playing 13 of 15 league matches for 2019–20 season before the league was cancelled due to the COVID-19 pandemic in Ghana. In the 2020–21 season, Amofa played 27 league matches, starting in all of those matches.

References

External links 

 
 

Living people
1999 births
Association football defenders
Ghanaian footballers
Liberty Professionals F.C. players
Ghana Premier League players